The Anglican Church of the Holy Trinity at Chilton Trinity in the English county of Somerset was established in the 13th century. It is a Grade II* listed building.

History

Parts of the fabric of the building, including the arch of the south doorway, are from the 11th century, although there is some controversary about the specific dates for parts of the building. The building was restored in the 15th and 19th centuries. The tower was added in the 15th century.

The parish is part of the benefice of Bridgwater St Mary and Chilton Trinity within the Diocese of Bath and Wells.

Architecture

The church consists of a two-bay nave, chancel and south porch with a three-stage west tower, which is supported by diagonal buttresses. The tower holds five bells.

Inside the church is a 15th century font.

See also  
 List of ecclesiastical parishes in the Diocese of Bath and Wells

References

Grade II* listed buildings in Sedgemoor
Grade II* listed churches in Somerset